Cyana loloana is a moth of the  family Erebidae. It was described by Strand in 1912. It is found in Cameroon.

References

Endemic fauna of Cameroon
Cyana
Moths described in 1912